Robert Evert Stong (August 23, 1936, Oklahoma City – April 10, 2008, Charlottesville, Virginia) was a mathematician at the University of Virginia who proved the Hattori–Stong theorem.

Early life and education
Stong received a B.A. and M.A. in mathematics at the University of Oklahoma. He received a Ph.D. in mathematics from the University of Chicago in 1962. His Ph.D. dissertation, Some relations among characteristic classes and numbers, was written under the supervision of Richard Lashof. He served on active duty with the United States Army Reserves from 1962 to 1965 and was stationed at Fort Benjamin Harrison and the Pentagon. He worked on computer development and rose to the rank of captain.

Career
After serving with the Army, he went to the University of Oxford as a post-doctoral fellow (1964–66), and then to Princeton University as faculty (1966–68). In 1968 he became Professor of Mathematics at the University of Virginia, where he taught until his retirement in 2007.

His doctoral students included Nelson Saiers.

Selected publications

References

Sources

1936 births
2008 deaths
People from Oklahoma City
University of Virginia faculty
20th-century American mathematicians
21st-century American mathematicians
Topologists
University of Chicago alumni
University of Oklahoma alumni
Princeton University faculty
Academics of the University of Oxford
United States Army officers
Mathematicians from Oklahoma